The 1991–92 Slovenian Basketball League was the first season of the Premier A Slovenian Basketball League, the highest professional basketball league in Slovenia.
The first half of the season consisted of 16 teams and 2 groups (14 games for each of the 16 teams) began on Saturday, 5 October 1991 and ended on 28 December 1991.

Teams for the 1991–92 season

Green group

P=Matches played, W=Matches won, L=Matches lost, F=Points for, A=Points against, Pts=Points

Red group

P=Matches played, W=Matches won, L=Matches lost, F=Points for, A=Points against, Pts=Points

Green group final standings

P=Matches played, W=Matches won, L=Matches lost, F=Points for, A=Points against, Pts=Points

Red group final standings

P=Matches played, W=Matches won, L=Matches lost, F=Points for, A=Points against, Pts=Points

Playoffs

External links
Official Basketball Federation of Slovenia website 

Slovenian Basketball League seasons
Slovenia
1